Mosen is a former municipality in the district of Hochdorf in the canton of Lucerne in Switzerland.  On 1 January 2009 it became part of the municipality of Hitzkirch.

History
Mosen is first mentioned in 1045 as Moseheim though this comes from a 14th Century copy.  In 1264 it was mentioned as Mosheim.

Geography

Of this area, 70.9% is used for agricultural purposes, while 15.2% is forested. Of the rest of the land, 11.4% is settled (buildings or roads) and the remainder (2.5%) is non-productive (rivers, glaciers or mountains).
The municipality is located in the Seetal valley region on the south end of Lake Hallwil.

On 21 May 2006 an attempt to merge the Hitzkirch and the surrounding 10 municipalities failed, when five of the eleven voted against the merger.  A less ambitious merger was then proposed and accepted, with the municipalities of Gelfingen, Hämikon, Mosen, Müswangen, Retschwil and Sulz joining Hitzkirch.

Demographics
Mosen has a population of 284, of which 6.0% are foreign nationals.  Over the last 10 years the population has grown at a rate of 18.3%.  Most of the population speaks German  (90.2%), with Albanian being second most common ( 2.8%) and Turkish being third ( 2.0%).

In the 2007 election the most popular party was the SVP which received 38.9% of the vote.  The next three most popular parties were the FDP (28.1%), the CVP (27.2%) and the Green Party (2.8%).

The age distribution of the population is children and teenagers (0–19 years old) make up 31.5% of the population, while adults (20–64 years old) make up 58.7% and seniors (over 64 years old) make up 9.8%.  The entire Swiss population is generally well educated.  In Mosen about 72.9% of the population (between age 25-64) have completed either non-mandatory upper secondary education or additional higher education (either University or a Fachhochschule).

Mosen has an unemployment rate of 1.33%.  , there were 21 people employed in the primary economic sector and about 7 businesses involved in this sector.  141 people are employed in the secondary sector and there are 3 businesses in this sector.  21 people are employed in the tertiary sector, with 10 businesses in this sector.

The historical population is given in the following table:

References

Former municipalities of the canton of Lucerne